Gustavo Rojas may refer to:

 Gustavo Rojas Pinilla (1900–1975), President of Colombia, 1953–1957
 Gustavo Rojas (footballer) (born 1988), Colombian football defender for Bogotá F.C
 Gustavo Rojas (golfer) (born 1967), Argentine golfer